Stefano Gobbi (22 March 1930 – 29 June 2011) was an Italian Roman Catholic priest. He was born in the Province of Como, Italy and was ordained as a priest in 1964. He later obtained a doctorate in sacred theology from the Pontifical Lateran University in Rome. He founded the worldwide Catholic movement, the Marian Movement of Priests (MMP) following what he reported as an interior locution in 1972 at the shrine of Our Lady of Fatima. The Roman Catholic Church has never officially recognized the purported interior locutions of Gobbi as being of a heavenly nature.

The pivotal event
On 8 May 1972 he was on a pilgrimage to Fátima, Portugal and was praying in the shrine of Our Lady of Fatima. He reported an interior locution from the Virgin Mary. He did not claim a Marian apparition, but a locution, i.e. an internal voice. This inner voice urged him to gather other priests who would be willing to consecrate themselves to the Immaculate Heart of Mary and be strongly united with the Pope and the Catholic Church.

According to Gobbi, he later prayed to the Blessed Virgin Mary for a confirmation of the inner voice, which he reported as receiving in May 1972 while praying in the Church of the Annunciation in Nazareth.  On 13 October 1972, on the 55th anniversary of Our Lady of Fatima he and two other priests formed the Marian Movement of Priests in a church in Gera Lario near Como, Italy.

Growth of the movement
The Marian Movement of Priests grew and by September 1973 included over 80 priests when it held its first national meeting at San Vittorino, near Rome. In 1974, Gobbi started to hold prayer cenacles in Italy for priests and laity, and later held prayer cenacles all over the world. During the cenacle Catholics are called to pray to Jesus through Saint Mary, since it was through her that the Church, the Body of Christ, was born. The MMP is now based in Milan Italy, with branches worldwide. The Marian Movement of Priests in the United States was established in 1975, is based in St. Francis, Maine, and received an official papal blessing from Pope John Paul II in November 1993.

The messages
In July 1973, Gobbi began to write his reported interior locutions as messages which he attributed to the Virgin Mary. The messages from July 1973 to December 1997 were published in the book: "To the Priests, Our Lady's Beloved Sons". Cardinal Bernardino Echeverría Ruiz, OFM, Cardinal Ignatius Moussa Daoud and Cardinal John Baptist Wu provided their imprimatur for Gobbi's book. The messages have a pronounced apocalyptic tone.

Relationship with the Vatican
To date, the Congregation for the Doctrine of the Faith has not taken an official position on the authenticity of Gobbi's interior locutions.  The MMP meets regularly in Rome.

Later in life
Prior to his death, Gobbi was officially based in Milan, but continued to travel worldwide to hold prayer cenacles and promote the cause of the MMP. He died on 29 June 2011 after suffering a heart attack earlier that month.

References

External links
 Catholic Answers article about MMP
 EWTN Network

Visions of Jesus and Mary
2011 deaths
1930 births
People from the Province of Como
20th-century Italian Roman Catholic priests
21st-century Italian Roman Catholic priests
Place of death missing
Pontifical Lateran University alumni